Felsted (sometimes spelt Felstead) is a village and civil parish in the Uttlesford district of Essex, England. The civil parish includes the hamlets of Bannister Green, Bartholomew Green, Causeway End, Coblers Green, Cock Green, Frenches Green, Gransmore Green, Hartford End, Molehill Green, Milch Hill, Thistley Green, Watch House Green and Willows Green.

History
Felsted is recorded in the Domesday Book of 1086 as Felesteda, Felstede and Phensteda in the Hundred of Hinckford, where it was held by Earl Ælfgar as feu  in the time of King Edward. In 1086, Felstead was part of the land of La Trinité of Caen, who held four hides. The fifth hide was no longer in this manor as King William gave three virgates to Roger God-save-the-ladies and the fourth to Geoffrey fitzSalomon.

The village has links to Lord Riche who founded the public school, the Felsted School, in 1564, and is buried in Holy Cross Church. Lord Riche was an important benefactor of the Felsted Church. The school also has links to Oliver Cromwell, who sent his sons there. The valley between Little Dunmow and Felsted was the location for the only sugar beet factory in Essex, which has been redeveloped for housing in a community called Flitch Green.

Geography
Felsted is south of the A120 and is near Braintree, Great Dunmow and Chelmsford. It lies on the north bank of the River Chelmer as it leaves Great Dunmow and turns south towards Chelmsford.
 Latitude/Longitude in decimal degrees:51.85656 0.43327
 Latitude/Longitude in degrees, minutes, and seconds:51° 51' 24" North 0° 26' 60" East
 Height above sea level:76 m,   249.34 ft,   2992.13 in

Community

Felsted is linked to Little Dunmow by the Flitch Way Country Park, a former railway line.  The village has a village store, a delicatessen, an antiques shop, a ladies' clothes shop, an estate agent, two public houses (the Chequers and the Swan), two restaurants, and a bed and breakfast guest house.

The village is also home of Felsted Rovers Football Club who play their home matches at the rear of the Memorial Hall. 

The electoral ward of Felsted had a population of 5,525 at the 2011 census.

See also
The Hundred Parishes

References

 John Drury, History of Felsted (privately published, 1999) 
 (Registration required.)

External links
 
 Felsted's History by Jules Wallis, Recorders of Uttlesford History

 
Villages in Essex
Civil parishes in Essex
Uttlesford